Jahangusha-i Naderi, is a book on the reign and wars of Nader Shah, written by Mirza Mehdi Khan Astarabadi, Nader's official historian. Jahangusha-i Naderi is the most important book on the history of Iran during Nader's rule. The author of the book was a companion of Nader and he saw many of the events with his own eyes.

It seems that the original name of the book was Tarikh-i Naderi, but later became known as Jahangusha-i Naderi. The author himself called the book Ruznamcha-i Zafar. The book describes the historical events of Iran from 1708 to 1748, a year after the death of Nader. The author also wrote another book, Darra-i Nader, which is the shorter version of Jahangusha-i Naderi.

From linguistic point of view, the book is full of Arabic loanwords.

Sources 

 

Afsharid Iran
Iranian books
18th-century history books
Persian-language books